Sir Tatton Sykes, 5th Baronet (13 March 1826 – 4 May 1913) was an English landowner, racehorse breeder, church-builder and eccentric. 

He was the elder son of Sir Tatton Sykes, 4th Baronet and Mary Ann Foulis, and succeeded to the Sykes baronetcy on his father's death in 1863. His brother was the Conservative MP Christopher Sykes. He lived at Sledmere, near York and served as High Sheriff of Yorkshire for 1869–70.

On 3 August 1874, at the age of 48, he married Christina Anne Jessica Cavendish-Bentinck, daughter of George Augustus Frederick Cavendish-Bentinck and Prudentia-Penelope Leslie. His wife was 30 years younger than him and it was not a happy marriage. The couple eventually separated, with Sir Tatton disowning his wife's future debts.

Sykes died in May 1913 at age 87, and was succeeded in the baronetcy by his son Mark.

References

1826 births
1913 deaths
Baronets in the Baronetage of Great Britain
High Sheriffs of Yorkshire